Lumber baron William B. Cox purchased the team in 1943. On March 9, Cox announced that the team would officially be called the "Phillies" again after former-President Gerald Nugent had named them "Phils" prior to the 1942 season.

In 1943, the team rose out of the standings cellar for the first time in five years. The fans responded with an increase in attendance. Eventually, it was revealed by Cox that he had been betting on the Phillies, and he was banned from baseball.

Offseason

Spring training 
The Phillies opened spring training on March 18 in Hershey, Pennsylvania. They used the baseball diamond at Hershey High School.

Notable transactions 
 March 24, 1943: Schoolboy Rowe was purchased by the Phillies from the Brooklyn Dodgers.

Regular season

Season standings

Record vs. opponents

Game log

|- style="background:#bbb"
| – || April 21 || @ Braves || colspan=6 | Postponed (inclement weather); Makeup: June 23 as a traditional double-header
|- style="background:#bbb"
| – || April 22 || @ Braves || colspan=6 | Postponed (inclement weather); Makeup: September 16 as a traditional double-header
|- style="background:#fbb"
| 1 || April 24 || @ Dodgers || 4–11 || Bobo Newsom (1–0) || Al Gerheauser (0–1) || Les Webber (1) || 3,821 || 0–1
|- style="background:#bfb"
| 2 || April 25 || @ Dodgers || 3–2 || Jack Kraus (1–0) || Curt Davis (0–1) || None || 12,503 || 1–1
|- style="background:#fbb"
| 3 || April 27 || Dodgers || 2–4 || Whit Wyatt (1–0) || Schoolboy Rowe (0–1) || Les Webber (2) || 4,291 || 1–2
|- style="background:#fbb"
| 4 || April 28 || Dodgers || 3–4 (10) || Johnny Allen (1–0) || Johnny Podgajny (0–1) || None || 2,470 || 1–3
|- style="background:#fbb"
| 5 || April 29 || Dodgers || 3–4 || Newt Kimball (1–0) || Jack Kraus (1–1) || Les Webber (3) || 1,913 || 1–4
|- style="background:#bbb"
| – || April 30 || Braves || colspan=6 | Postponed (inclement weather); Makeup: June 15 as a traditional double-header
|-

|- style="background:#bbb"
| – || May 1 || Braves || colspan=6 | Postponed (inclement weather); Makeup: June 17 as a traditional double-header
|- style="background:#fbb"
| 6 || May 2 (1) || Braves || 1–3 || Nate Andrews (2–0) || Si Johnson (0–1) || None || see 2nd game || 1–5
|- style="background:#bfb"
| 7 || May 2 (2) || Braves || 6–5 (12) || Johnny Podgajny (1–1) || Red Barrett (1–1) || None || 12,942 || 2–5
|- style="background:#fbb"
| 8 || May 3 || @ Dodgers || 3–5 || Kirby Higbe (1–0) || Al Gerheauser (0–2) || None || 3,391 || 2–6
|- style="background:#bfb"
| 9 || May 4 || @ Dodgers || 3–1 || Jack Kraus (2–1) || Rube Melton (0–1) || None || 3,517 || 3–6
|- style="background:#fbb"
| 10 || May 5 || @ Dodgers || 6–18 || Max Macon (2–0) || Charlie Fuchs (0–1) || Newt Kimball (1) || 4,465 || 3–7
|- style="background:#bfb"
| 11 || May 6 || @ Dodgers || 3–2 (10) || Johnny Podgajny (2–1) || Bobo Newsom (2–1) || None || 2,043 || 4–7
|- style="background:#bfb"
| 12 || May 7 || Giants || 13–3 || Si Johnson (1–1) || Ken Trinkle (1–2) || None || 1,723 || 5–7
|- style="background:#fbb"
| 13 || May 8 || Giants || 5–7 || Ace Adams (1–0) || Charlie Fuchs (0–2) || Johnny Wittig (1) || 1,908 || 5–8
|- style="background:#bfb"
| 14 || May 9 (1) || Giants || 3–2 || Schoolboy Rowe (1–1) || Johnny Wittig (1–2) || None || see 2nd game || 6–8
|- style="background:#bfb"
| 15 || May 9 (2) || Giants || 3–1 || Jack Kraus (3–1) || Harry Feldman (0–2) || Si Johnson (1) || 24,934 || 7–8
|- style="background:#bbb"
| – || May 12 || Reds || colspan=6 | Postponed (inclement weather); Makeup: May 13 as a traditional double-header
|- style="background:#bfb"
| 16 || May 13 (1) || Reds || 2–1 || Si Johnson (2–1) || Ray Starr (1–3) || None || see 2nd game || 8–8
|- style="background:#fbb"
| 17 || May 13 (2) || Reds || 1–3 || Elmer Riddle (2–3) || Johnny Podgajny (2–2) || Clyde Shoun (1) || 5,210 || 8–9
|- style="background:#bbb"
| – || May 14 || Reds || colspan=6 | Postponed (inclement weather); Makeup: July 8 as a traditional double-header
|- style="background:#fbb"
| 18 || May 15 || Cardinals || 3–6 || Mort Cooper (3–1) || Charlie Fuchs (0–3) || None || 3,613 || 8–10
|- style="background:#fbb"
| 19 || May 16 (1) || Cardinals || 3–4 (11) || Howie Krist (1–0) || Schoolboy Rowe (1–2) || None || see 2nd game || 8–11
|- style="background:#bfb"
| 20 || May 16 (2) || Cardinals || 2–1 || Al Gerheauser (1–2) || Harry Gumbert (1–3) || None || 30,823 || 9–11
|- style="background:#bfb"
| 21 || May 17 || Cubs || 8–4 || Johnny Podgajny (3–2) || Claude Passeau (1–2) || None || 2,000 || 10–11
|- style="background:#bfb"
| 22 || May 18 || Cubs || 5–4 || Si Johnson (3–1) || Hiram Bithorn (3–4) || None || 20,820 || 11–11
|- style="background:#bbb"
| – || May 19 || Cubs || colspan=6 | Postponed (inclement weather); Makeup: May 20 as a traditional double-header
|- style="background:#bfb"
| 23 || May 20 (1) || Cubs || 3–0 || Charlie Fuchs (1–3) || Bill Lee (1–2) || None || see 2nd game || 12–11
|- style="background:#bfb"
| 24 || May 20 (2) || Cubs || 2–0 || Al Gerheauser (2–2) || Dick Barrett (0–3) || None || 3,429 || 13–11
|- style="background:#bbb"
| – || May 21 || Pirates || colspan=6 | Postponed (inclement weather); Makeup: July 1 as a traditional double-header
|- style="background:#bfb"
| 25 || May 22 || Pirates || 10–0 || Schoolboy Rowe (2–2) || Bob Klinger (2–1) || None || 11,692 || 14–11
|- style="background:#fbb"
| 26 || May 23 (1) || Pirates || 1–4 || Rip Sewell (4–1) || Johnny Podgajny (3–3) || None || see 2nd game || 14–12
|- style="background:#bfb"
| 27 || May 23 (2) || Pirates || 5–2 || Jack Kraus (4–1) || Xavier Rescigno (1–3) || Si Johnson (2) || 37,176 || 15–12
|- style="background:#fbb"
| 28 || May 26 || @ Reds || 0–1 || Bucky Walters (3–3) || Charlie Fuchs (1–4) || None || 7,512 || 15–13
|- style="background:#fbb"
| 29 || May 27 || @ Reds || 0–7 || Elmer Riddle (3–3) || Si Johnson (3–2) || None || 1,084 || 15–14
|- style="background:#fbb"
| 30 || May 28 || @ Reds || 8–11 || Clyde Shoun (1–1) || Johnny Podgajny (3–4) || None || 1,542 || 15–15
|- style="background:#fbb"
| 31 || May 29 || @ Pirates || 4–12 || Xavier Rescigno (2–3) || Al Gerheauser (2–3) || None || 1,727 || 15–16
|- style="background:#fbb"
| 32 || May 30 (1) || @ Pirates || 3–4 || Rip Sewell (5–1) || Schoolboy Rowe (2–3) || None || see 2nd game || 15–17
|- style="background:#fbb"
| 33 || May 30 (2) || @ Pirates || 1–2 (10) || Wally Hebert (3–2) || Jack Kraus (4–2) || None || 7,297 || 15–18
|- style="background:#bfb"
| 34 || May 31 (1) || @ Cubs || 10–4 || Johnny Podgajny (4–4) || Dick Barrett (0–4) || None || see 2nd game || 16–18
|- style="background:#fbb"
| 35 || May 31 (2) || @ Cubs || 2–8 || Ray Prim (1–1) || Charlie Fuchs (1–5) || Hank Wyse (2) || 23,256 || 16–19
|-

|- style="background:#bfb"
| 36 || June 1 || @ Cubs || 7–2 || Si Johnson (4–2) || Hiram Bithorn (4–6) || None || 1,810 || 17–19
|- style="background:#bfb"
| 37 || June 2 || @ Cubs || 6–5 || Schoolboy Rowe (3–3) || Claude Passeau (3–3) || Jack Kraus (1) || 2,652 || 18–19
|- style="background:#fbb"
| 38 || June 3 || @ Cardinals || 2–8 || Murry Dickson (3–0) || Al Gerheauser (2–4) || None || 1,126 || 18–20
|- style="background:#fbb"
| 39 || June 4 || @ Cardinals || 0–5 || Mort Cooper (6–3) || Charlie Fuchs (1–6) || None || 6,008 || 18–21
|- style="background:#bfb"
| 40 || June 5 || @ Cardinals || 2–1 || Jack Kraus (5–2) || Howie Krist (2–1) || None || 1,678 || 19–21
|- style="background:#fffdd0"
| 41 || June 6 (1) || @ Cardinals || 1–1 (5) || None || None || None ||  || 19–21–1
|- style="background:#bbb"
| – || June 6 (2) || @ Cardinals || colspan=6 | Postponed (inclement weather); Makeup: July 27 as a traditional double-header
|- style="background:#bbb"
| – || June 9 || @ Giants || colspan=6 | Postponed (inclement weather); Makeup: June 12 as a traditional double-header
|- style="background:#bfb"
| 42 || June 12 (1) || @ Giants || 3–2 || Schoolboy Rowe (4–3) || Bill Lohrman (4–5) || Newt Kimball (2) || see 2nd game || 20–21–1
|- style="background:#bfb"
| 43 || June 12 (2) || @ Giants || 4–3 || Al Gerheauser (3–4) || Johnny Wittig (3–6) || Charlie Fuchs (1) || 9,802 || 21–21–1
|- style="background:#fbb"
| 44 || June 13 (1) || @ Giants || 2–6 || Carl Hubbell (2–0) || Si Johnson (4–3) || None || see 2nd game || 21–22–1
|- style="background:#fbb"
| 45 || June 13 (2) || @ Giants || 3–4 (10) || Rube Fischer (1–0) || Newt Kimball (1–2) || None || 16,129 || 21–23–1
|- style="background:#bfb"
| 46 || June 15 (1) || Braves || 6–4 || Charlie Fuchs (2–6) || Red Barrett (3–5) || None || see 2nd game || 22–23–1
|- style="background:#bfb"
| 47 || June 15 (2) || Braves || 2–1 || Al Gerheauser (4–4) || Dave Odom (0–1) || None || 6,679 || 23–23–1
|- style="background:#bfb"
| 48 || June 16 || Braves || 2–0 || Si Johnson (5–3) || Jim Tobin (4–4) || None || 9,802 || 24–23–1
|- style="background:#fbb"
| 49 || June 17 (1) || Braves || 0–2 || Manny Salvo (1–2) || Jack Kraus (5–3) || None || 6,000 || 24–24–1
|- style="background:#bfb"
| 50 || June 17 (2) || Braves || 7–2 || Newt Kimball (2–2) || Nate Andrews (5–6) || None || 7,379 || 25–24–1
|- style="background:#bfb"
| 51 || June 18 || @ Dodgers || 10–8 || Dutch Dietz (1–3) || Curt Davis (1–4) || None || 3,654 || 26–24–1
|- style="background:#fbb"
| 52 || June 19 || @ Dodgers || 5–7 || Freddie Fitzsimmons (3–1) || Charlie Fuchs (2–7) || Les Webber (7) || 8,618 || 26–25–1
|- style="background:#bfb"
| 53 || June 20 (1) || @ Braves || 13–7 || Si Johnson (6–3) || Nate Andrews (5–7) || Dutch Dietz (1) || see 2nd game || 27–25–1
|- style="background:#bfb"
| 54 || June 20 (2) || @ Braves || 7–0 || Schoolboy Rowe (5–3) || Jim Tobin (4–5) || None || 16,994 || 28–25–1
|- style="background:#fbb"
| 55 || June 22 || @ Braves || 6–7 || Manny Salvo (2–2) || Jack Kraus (5–4) || Dave Odom (1) || 1,636 || 28–26–1
|- style="background:#fbb"
| 56 || June 23 (1) || @ Braves || 0–1 || Red Barrett (4–6) || Newt Kimball (2–3) || None || see 2nd game || 28–27–1
|- style="background:#fbb"
| 57 || June 23 (2) || @ Braves || 3–4 (11) || Al Javery (7–4) || Al Gerheauser (4–5) || None || 4,560 || 28–28–1
|- style="background:#bfb"
| 58 || June 24 || @ Braves || 12–5 || Si Johnson (7–3) || Dave Odom (0–2) || None || 1,585 || 29–28–1
|- style="background:#bfb"
| 59 || June 25 || Dodgers || 8–2 || Schoolboy Rowe (6–3) || Bobo Newsom (7–3) || None || 21,504 || 30–28–1
|- style="background:#fbb"
| 60 || June 26 || Dodgers || 2–3 || Kirby Higbe (4–3) || Jack Kraus (5–5) || Ed Head (2) || 7,688 || 30–29–1
|- style="background:#fbb"
| 61 || June 27 (1) || Dodgers || 4–9 || Ed Head (5–3) || Jack Kraus (5–6) || None || see 2nd game || 30–30–1
|- style="background:#fbb"
| 62 || June 27 (2) || Dodgers || 0–6 || Rube Melton (4–4) || Al Gerheauser (4–6) || None || 27,866 || 30–31–1
|- style="background:#fffdd0"
| 63 || June 30 || Pirates || 3–3 (11) || None || None || None || 10,655 || 30–31–2
|-

|- style="background:#bfb"
| 64 || July 1 (1) || Pirates || 6–1 || Schoolboy Rowe (7–3) || Johnny Podgajny (4–7) || None || see 2nd game || 31–31–2
|- style="background:#fbb"
| 65 || July 1 (2) || Pirates || 1–2 || Bob Klinger (5–1) || Al Gerheauser (4–7) || None || 6,884 || 31–32–2
|- style="background:#fbb"
| 66 || July 2 || Pirates || 1–2 || Rip Sewell (11–2) || Jack Kraus (5–7) || None || 3,669 || 31–33–2
|- style="background:#fbb"
| 67 || July 3 || Cubs || 1–6 || Hank Wyse (1–3) || Newt Kimball (2–4) || None || 3,984 || 31–34–2
|- style="background:#bfb"
| 68 || July 4 (1) || Cubs || 2–1 || Si Johnson (8–3) || Hiram Bithorn (8–8) || None || see 2nd game || 32–34–2
|- style="background:#fbb"
| 69 || July 4 (2) || Cubs || 2–5 || Bill Lee (3–4) || Dick Barrett (0–5) || None || 15,671 || 32–35–2
|- style="background:#bfb"
| 70 || July 5 (1) || Cardinals || 15–2 || Al Gerheauser (5–7) || Murry Dickson (3–1) || None || see 2nd game || 33–35–2
|- style="background:#fbb"
| 71 || July 5 (2) || Cardinals || 3–4 || Howie Krist (6–2) || Dutch Dietz (1–4) || None || 21,067 || 33–36–2
|- style="background:#fbb"
| 72 || July 6 || Cardinals || 0–4 || Harry Gumbert (6–4) || Jack Kraus (5–8) || None || 3,915 || 33–37–2
|- style="background:#bbb"
| – || July 7 || Cardinals || colspan=6 | Postponed (inclement weather); Makeup: August 18 as a traditional double-header
|- style="background:#fbb"
| 73 || July 8 (1) || Reds || 5–7 || Johnny Vander Meer (7–9) || Dale Matthewson (0–1) || None || see 2nd game || 33–38–2
|- style="background:#bfb"
| 74 || July 8 (2) || Reds || 1–0 (14) || Dick Barrett (1–5) || Joe Beggs (2–3) || None || 4,714 || 34–38–2
|- style="background:#fbb"
| 75 || July 9 || Reds || 4–11 || Clyde Shoun (5–2) || Newt Kimball (2–5) || None || 8,286 || 34–39–2
|- style="background:#fbb"
| 76 || July 10 || Reds || 2–6 || Elmer Riddle (11–4) || Dick Conger (0–1) || None || 3,808 || 34–40–2
|- style="background:#fbb"
| 77 || July 11 (1) || Reds || 4–7 || Bucky Walters (4–9) || Schoolboy Rowe (7–4) || None || see 2nd game || 34–41–2
|- style="background:#fbb"
| 78 || July 11 || Reds || 2–14 (8) || Ray Starr (8–7) || Al Gerheauser (5–8) || None || 14,273 || 34–42–2
|- style="background:#bbcaff;"
| – || July 13 ||colspan="7" | 1943 Major League Baseball All-Star Game at Shibe Park in Philadelphia
|- style="background:#bfb"
| 79 || July 15 || Giants || 9–1 || Dick Barrett (2–5) || Rube Fischer (4–3) || None || 8,141 || 35–42–2
|- style="background:#bfb"
| 80 || July 17 (1) || Giants || 2–1 || Dick Conger (1–1) || Johnny Wittig (5–9) || None || see 2nd game || 36–42–2
|- style="background:#fbb"
| 81 || July 17 (2) || Giants || 7–8 || Ace Adams (7–3) || Dale Matthewson (0–2) || Bill Lohrman (1) || 11,074 || 36–43–2
|- style="background:#fbb"
| 82 || July 18 (1) || Giants || 6–10 || Bill Lohrman (5–5) || Newt Kimball (2–6) || None || see 2nd game || 36–44–2
|- style="background:#fbb"
| 83 || July 18 (2) || Giants || 2–3 || Ken Chase (2–7) || Andy Karl (1–2) || None || 14,589 || 36–45–2
|- style="background:#fbb"
| 84 || July 20 || @ Pirates || 0–1 || Rip Sewell (14–3) || Dick Barrett (2–6) || None || 11,996 || 36–46–2
|- style="background:#fbb"
| 85 || July 21 || @ Pirates || 2–10 || Bob Klinger (7–3) || Dick Conger (1–2) || None || 2,041 || 36–47–2
|- style="background:#bfb"
| 86 || July 22 (1) || @ Pirates || 3–0 || Schoolboy Rowe (8–4) || Max Butcher (5–3) || None || see 2nd game || 37–47–2
|- style="background:#bfb"
| 87 || July 22 (2) || @ Pirates || 9–6 || Jack Kraus (6–8) || Hank Gornicki (3–8) || None || 5,199 || 38–47–2
|- style="background:#fbb"
| 88 || July 23 || @ Pirates || 2–3 || Johnny Gee (1–0) || Al Gerheauser (5–9) || None || 1,895 || 38–48–2
|- style="background:#fbb"
| 89 || July 24 || @ Reds || 3–5 || Clyde Shoun (6–3) || Andy Karl (1–3) || None || 1,857 || 38–49–2
|- style="background:#fbb"
| 90 || July 25 (1) || @ Reds || 3–7 || Elmer Riddle (13–5) || Dick Conger (1–3) || None || see 2nd game || 38–50–2
|- style="background:#bfb"
| 91 || July 25 (2) || @ Reds || 3–1 || Dick Barrett (3–6) || Ed Heusser (2–3) || None || 10,346 || 39–50–2
|- style="background:#fbb"
| 92 || July 26 || @ Reds || 2–8 || Ray Starr (10–7) || Jack Kraus (6–9) || None || 1,541 || 39–51–2
|- style="background:#fbb"
| 93 || July 27 (1) || @ Cardinals || 2–6 || Murry Dickson (5–1) || Al Gerheauser (5–10) || None || see 2nd game || 39–52–2
|- style="background:#fbb"
| 94 || July 27 (2) || @ Cardinals || 2–5 || Howie Krist (7–3) || Dick Conger (1–4) || None || 2,929 || 39–53–2
|- style="background:#bfb"
| 95 || July 28 || @ Cardinals || 6–4 || Schoolboy Rowe (9–4) || Red Munger (4–2) || Dutch Dietz (2) || 17,883 || 40–53–2
|- style="background:#fbb"
| 96 || July 29 || @ Cardinals || 5–13 || Red Munger (5–2) || Dick Barrett (3–7) || None || 1,676 || 40–54–2
|- style="background:#bfb"
| 97 || July 30 || @ Cardinals || 3–2 (11) || Al Gerheauser (6–10) || Mort Cooper (14–6) || None || 7,606 || 41–54–2
|- style="background:#fbb"
| 98 || July 31 || @ Cubs || 1–3 || Ed Hanyzewski (5–1) || Dick Conger (1–5) || None || 6,238 || 41–55–2
|-

|- style="background:#bfb"
| 99 || August 1 (1) || @ Cubs || 4–1 || Dick Barrett (4–7) || Claude Passeau (10–7) || None || see 2nd game || 42–55–2
|- style="background:#bfb"
| 100 || August 1 (2) || @ Cubs || 5–3 || Al Gerheauser (7–10) || Hank Wyse (5–4) || None || 34,086 || 43–55–2
|- style="background:#bbb"
| – || August 3 || @ Cubs || colspan=6 | Postponed (inclement weather); Makeup: September 22 as a traditional double-header
|- style="background:#fbb"
| 101 || August 4 || @ Pirates || 2–6 || Max Butcher (6–4) || Al Gerheauser (7–11) || None || 10,417 || 43–56–2
|- style="background:#bfb"
| 102 || August 6 || @ Giants || 7–4 || Dick Barrett (5–7) || Ken Chase (2–10) || Bill Lee (1) || 6,358 || 44–56–2
|- style="background:#bfb"
| 103 || August 7 || @ Giants || 9–6 || Andy Karl (2–3) || Johnny Wittig (5–12) || Schoolboy Rowe (1) || 4,982 || 45–56–2
|- style="background:#bfb"
| 104 || August 8 (1) || @ Giants || 5–1 || Jack Kraus (7–9) || Cliff Melton (5–7) || None || see 2nd game || 46–56–2
|- style="background:#bfb"
| 105 || August 8 (2) || @ Giants || 8–2 || Al Gerheauser (8–11) || Van Mungo (0–3) || Dick Barrett (1) || 16,736 || 47–56–2
|- style="background:#bfb"
| 106 || August 11 (1) || Pirates || 2–1 || Schoolboy Rowe (10–4) || Rip Sewell (17–5) || None || see 2nd game || 48–56–2
|- style="background:#bfb"
| 107 || August 11 (2) || Pirates || 2–0 || Dick Barrett (6–7) || Hank Gornicki (4–9) || None || 11,129 || 49–56–2
|- style="background:#bfb"
| 108 || August 12 || Pirates || 4–3 || Dick Conger (2–5) || Xavier Rescigno (5–8) || Newt Kimball (3) || 12,065 || 50–56–2
|- style="background:#bbb"
| – || August 13 || Pirates || colspan=6 | Postponed (inclement weather); Makeup: August 14 as a traditional double-header
|- style="background:#fbb"
| 109 || August 14 (1) || Pirates || 2–8 || Bob Klinger (9–5) || Jack Kraus (7–10) || None || see 2nd game || 50–57–2
|- style="background:#fbb"
| 110 || August 14 (2) || Pirates || 1–2 || Max Butcher (7–4) || Al Gerheauser (8–12) || Hank Gornicki (2) ||  6,344 || 50–58–2
|- style="background:#fbb"
| 111 || August 15 (1) || Cubs || 2–5 || Hiram Bithorn (15–9) || Dick Barrett (6–8) || None || see 2nd game || 50–59–2
|- style="background:#fbb"
| 112 || August 15 (2) || Cubs || 0–3 || Paul Derringer (7–10) || Bill Lee (3–8) || None || 16,257 || 50–60–2
|- style="background:#bfb"
| 113 || August 16 || Cubs || 4–3 || Schoolboy Rowe (11–4) || Paul Erickson (0–2) || None || 6,460 || 51–60–2
|- style="background:#fbb"
| 114 || August 17 || Cubs || 5–7 || Ray Prim (3–3) || Dick Conger (2–6) || Paul Derringer (3) || 1,200 || 51–61–2
|- style="background:#fbb"
| 115 || August 18 (1) || Cardinals || 0–6 || Howie Krist (8–4) || Jack Kraus (7–11) || None || see 2nd game || 51–62–2
|- style="background:#bfb"
| 116 || August 18 (2) || Cardinals || 6–3 || Al Gerheauser (9–12) ||  Red Munger (6–4) || None || 16,514 || 52–62–2
|- style="background:#bfb"
| 117 || August 19 || Cardinals || 6–5 || Dick Barrett (7–8) ||  Max Lanier (9–6) || Jack Kraus (2) || 13,733 || 53–62–2
|- style="background:#fbb"
| 118 || August 20 || Cardinals || 1–5 || Mort Cooper (17–7) || Bill Lee (3–9) ||  Howie Krist (3) || 12,678 || 53–63–2
|- style="background:#bfb"
| 119 || August 21 || Cardinals || 3–2 || Schoolboy Rowe (12–4) ||  Harry Brecheen (5–4) || None || 3,400 || 54–63–2
|- style="background:#fbb"
| 120 || August 22 (1) || Reds || 3–4 || Elmer Riddle (16–8) || Al Gerheauser (9–13) || Clyde Shoun (5) || see 2nd game || 54–64–2
|- style="background:#fbb"
| 121 || August 22 (2) || Reds || 6–20 || Joe Beggs (4–3) || Dick Conger (2–7) || None || 16,385 || 54–65–2
|- style="background:#fbb"
| 122 || August 24 || Reds || 2–4 || Clyde Shoun (11–3) || Dick Barrett (7–9) || None || 8,756 || 54–66–2
|- style="background:#fbb"
| 123 || August 28 || Dodgers || 7–14 || Rex Barney (2–0) || Al Gerheauser (9–14) || Curt Davis (3) || 4,464 || 54–67–2
|- style="background:#fbb"
| 124 || August 29 (1) || Dodgers || 1–3 || Whit Wyatt (9–5) || Dick Barrett (7–10) || None || see 2nd game || 54–68–2
|- style="background:#fbb"
| 125 || August 29 (2) || Dodgers || 0–8 || Ed Head (7–8) || Schoolboy Rowe (12–5) || None || 17,013 || 54–69–2
|- style="background:#fbb"
| 126 || August 31 || Dodgers || 2–4 || Kirby Higbe (9–10) || Jack Kraus (7–12) || None || 9,428 || 54–70–2
|-

|- style="background:#fbb"
| 127 || September 2 || Braves || 2–3 (10) || Al Javery (14–12) || Al Gerheauser (9–15) || None || 4,018 || 54–71–2
|- style="background:#bbb"
| – || September 4 || Braves || colspan=6 | Postponed (inclement weather); Makeup: September 18 as a traditional double-header in Boston
|- style="background:#bfb"
| 128 || September 5 (1) || Braves || 2–1 || Dick Barrett (8–10) || Jim Tobin (12–10) || None || see 2nd game || 55–71–2
|- style="background:#bfb"
| 129 || September 5 (2) || Braves || 5–1 || Schoolboy Rowe (13–5) || Red Barrett (10–15) || Bill Lee (2) || 8,175 || 56–71–2
|- style="background:#fbb"
| 130 || September 6 (1) || @ Giants || 3–6 || Rube Fischer (5–7) || Al Gerheauser (9–16) || Ace Adams (9) || see 2nd game || 56–72–2
|- style="background:#bfb"
| 131 || September 6 (2) || @ Giants || 3–1 (11) || Jack Kraus (8–12) || Ken Chase (3–15) || None || 12,183 || 57–72–2
|- style="background:#bfb"
| 132 || September 8 || @ Giants || 3–2 || Bill Lee (4–9) || Cliff Melton (7–10) || None || 1,157 || 58–72–2
|- style="background:#fbb"
| 133 || September 9 || @ Dodgers || 6–7 || Les Webber (2–1) || Dick Barrett (8–11) || None || 4,825 || 58–73–2
|- style="background:#fbb"
| 134 || September 11 || @ Dodgers || 2–7 || Kirby Higbe (11–10) || Schoolboy Rowe (13–6) || Ed Head (6) || 8,687 || 58–74–2
|- style="background:#fbb"
| 135 || September 12 || @ Dodgers || 4–8 || Curt Davis (10–9) || Al Gerheauser (9–17) || Les Webber (10) || 13,722 || 58–75–2
|- style="background:#fffdd0"
| 136 || September 14 || Giants || 4–4 (10) || None || None || None || 3,447 || 58–75–3
|- style="background:#bfb"
| 137 || September 15 (1) || Giants || 1–0 || Jack Kraus (9–12) || Van Mungo (2–7) || None || see 2nd game || 59–75–3
|- style="background:#fbb"
| 138 || September 15 (2) || Giants || 3–6 || Hugh East (1–1) || Bill Lee (4–10) || Johnny Wittig (2) || 903 || 59–76–3
|- style="background:#bfb"
| 139 || September 16 (1) || @ Braves || 9–2 || Schoolboy Rowe (14–6) || Jim Tobin (12–12) || Bill Lee (3) || see 2nd game || 60–76–3
|- style="background:#fbb"
| 140 || September 16 (2) || @ Braves || 0–8 || Al Javery (15–14) || Dale Matthewson (0–3) || None || 1,532 || 60–77–3
|- style="background:#bbb"
| – || September 17 || @ Braves || colspan=6 | Postponed (inclement weather); Makeup: September 19 as a traditional double-header
|- style="background:#fbb"
| 141 || September 18 (1) || @ Braves || 0–2 || Nate Andrews (13–18) || Al Gerheauser (9–18) || None || see 2nd game || 60–78–3
|- style="background:#fbb"
| 142 || September 18 (2) || @ Braves || 1–2 || Red Barrett (12–16) || Dick Barrett (8–12) || None || 1,650 || 60–79–3
|- style="background:#fbb"
| 143 || September 19 (1) || @ Braves || 2–3 || Jim Tobin (13–12) || Jack Kraus (9–13) || None || see 2nd game || 60–80–3
|- style="background:#fbb"
| 144 || September 19 (2) || @ Braves || 5–6 (14) || Al Javery (16–14) || Newt Kimball (2–7) || None || 6,054 || 60–81–3
|- style="background:#fbb"
| 145 || September 22 (1) || @ Cubs || 1–5 || Claude Passeau (15–11) || Dick Barrett (8–13) || None || see 2nd game || 60–82–3
|- style="background:#bfb"
| 146 || September 22 (2) || @ Cubs || 3–0 || Al Gerheauser (10–18) || Hiram Bithorn (17–12) || None || 3,623 || 61–82–3
|- style="background:#fbb"
| 147 || September 23 || @ Cubs || 7–8 || Walter Signer (1–1) || Schoolboy Rowe (14–7) || John Burrows (2) || 1,177 || 61–83–3
|- style="background:#fbb"
| 148 || September 24 || @ Cubs || 4–7 (5) || Paul Derringer (9–14) || Bill Lee (4–11) || None || 314 || 61–84–3
|- style="background:#fbb"
| 149 || September 25 || @ Cardinals || 4–5 || Red Munger (9–4) || Jack Kraus (9–14) || None || 1,653 || 61–85–3
|- style="background:#fbb"
| 150 || September 26 (1) || @ Cardinals || 1–4 || Howie Krist (10–5) || Al Gerheauser (10–19) || None || see 2nd game || 61–86–3
|- style="background:#bfb"
| 151 || September 26 (2) || @ Cardinals || 3–2 (11) || Dick Barrett (9–13) || Red Munger (9–5) || None || 7,275 || 62–86–3
|- style="background:#fbb"
| 152 || September 27 || @ Reds || 2–3 || Clyde Shoun (14–5) || Bill Lee (4–12) || None || 767 || 62–87–3
|- style="background:#fbb"
| 153 || September 28 (1) || @ Reds || 3–4 || Ray Starr (11–10) || Schoolboy Rowe (14–8) || None || see 2nd game || 62–88–3
|- style="background:#fbb"
| 154 || September 28 (2) || @ Reds || 0–2 || Joe Beggs (6–6) || Jack Kraus (9–15) || None || 1,421 || 62–89–3
|- style="background:#fbb"
| 155 || September 29 || @ Reds || 0–3 || Johnny Vander Meer (14–16) || Ken Raffensberger (0–1) || None || 2,350 || 62–90–3
|-

|- style="background:#bfb"
| 156 || October 3 (1) || @ Pirates || 3–1 || Dick Barrett (10–13) || Johnny Gee (4–4) || None || see 2nd game || 63–90–3
|- style="background:#bfb"
| 157 || October 3 (2) || @ Pirates || 11–3 || Roger McKee (1–0) || Cookie Cuccurullo (0–1) || None || 5,430 || 64–90–3
|-

| style="text-align:left;" |
The June 5, 1943, game was protested by the Phillies in the middle of the eighth inning. The protest was later upheld and the game was completed with new umpires on June 29.
The first game of a scheduled double-header on June 6, 1943, ended after five innings due to rain with the score tied 1–1, and an additional game was played on July 30.
The second game of a scheduled double-header on June 13, 1943, ended with the score 6–3. After a verbal protest in the ninth inning, the Giants' Mel Ott lodged a formal protest. National League President Ford Frick ruled the hit batsman (Babe Dahlgren) out, and that the game be resumed on August 6.
The June 30, 1943, game ended after eleven innings due to the Major League Baseball curfew with the score tied 3–3, and an additional game was played on August 11.
The second game of a scheduled double-header on July 11, 1943, ended after eight innings due to the Pennsylvania Sunday curfew law with the score 8–14.
The original schedule indicated a single games on May 10 and July 17 with New York; which became a double-header on July 17.
The September 14, 1943, game ended after ten innings due to the National League curfew with the score tied 4–4, and an additional game was played on September 15.
The original schedule indicated a single games on October 2 and 3 at Pittsburgh; which became a double-header on October 3.

Roster

Player stats

Batting

Starters by position
Note: Pos = Position; G = Games played; AB = At bats; H = Hits; Avg. = Batting average; HR = Home runs; RBI = Runs batted in

Other batters
Note: G = Games played; AB = At bats; H = Hits; Avg. = Batting average; HR = Home runs; RBI = Runs batted in

Pitching

Starting pitchers 
Note: G = Games pitched; IP = Innings pitched; W = Wins; L = Losses; ERA = Earned run average; SO = Strikeouts

Other pitchers
Note: G = Games pitched; IP = Innings pitched; W = Wins; L = Losses; ERA = Earned run average; SO = Strikeouts

Relief pitchers
Note: G = Games pitched; W = Wins; L = Losses; SV = Saves; ERA = Earned run average; SO = Strikeouts

Farm system

References

External links
 1943 Philadelphia Phillies season at Baseball Reference

Philadelphia Phillies seasons
Philadelphia Phillies season
Philadelphia